This is a list of Italian football transfers for co-ownership resolutions, for the 2013–14 season, from and to Serie A and Serie B.

According to Article 102 bis of NOIF (Norme Organizzative Interne della F.I.G.C), the co-ownership deal must be confirmed each year. The deal may expire, be renewed, or one of the co-owners can buy back the other 50% of the player's rights. Deals that failed to form an agreement after the deadline, will be defined by auction between the 2 clubs: both clubs will submit their bid in a sealed envelope. Non-submission means the player's rights go to the other team for free. The mother club could sell their rights to third parties in a loan deal, like Emiliano Viviano in 2010 and Massimo Volta in 2007.

Non-EU players were marked with flag.

Co-ownership

Footnotes

References
general
 
  
  
 
specific

See also
 List of Italian football transfers summer 2012 (co-ownership)

2013–14 in Italian football
Italian
2013